Papilio deiphobus is a species of swallowtail butterfly in the Papilioninae subfamily. It is found from the Mollucas to Sulawesi in Indonesia.

The larvae feed on Citrus species.

Subspecies
Papilio deiphobus deiphobus (Serang, Ambon, Buru, Obi)
Papilio deiphobus deiphontes C. & R. Felder, 1864 (Sumatra, Morotai, Ternate, Halmahera, Bachan)
Papilio deiphobus deipylus C. & R. Felder, 1864 (Weigeu)
Papilio deiphobus tarawakana Page & Treadaway, 1993 (Tawitawi)

Now considered a separate species:
Papilio rumanzovia Eschscholtz, 1821 – scarlet Mormon (formerly Papilio deiphobus rumanzovia)

References

External links
 
 
 Butterflycorner.net

deiphobus
Butterflies described in 1758
Butterflies of Asia
Taxa named by Carl Linnaeus